ABT-670 is a drug which acts as a potent, orally bioavailable dopamine agonist selective for the D4 subtype, which was developed as a possible treatment for erectile dysfunction, although its current uses are limited to scientific research.

See also 
 ABT-724
 Bremelanotide
 Cabergoline
 Flibanserin
 Intrinsa
 Melanotan II
 Pramipexole
 PF-219,061
 Tibolone
 UK-414,495

References 

Dopamine agonists
Piperidines
Amine oxides
2-Pyridyl compounds